Frontier Scout is a 1938 American Western film directed by Sam Newfield starring George Houston as Wild Bill Hickok. It was filmed in Kernville, California.

Plot
After their daring activities in the War Between the States, former Army scouts and spies Wild Bill Hickok, Whiney Roberts and Steve Norris head West. Norris is losing cattle as are all the other ranchers in the area due to a large group of cattle rustlers who also kill every lawman they can find. Undercover U.S. Marshal Hickok and his sidekick Whiney are sent out to clear up the situation.

Cast
George Houston as  Wild Bill Hickok
Al St. John as Whiney Roberts
Beth Marion as Mary Ann Norris
 Stephen Chase as Mort Bennett 
Dave O'Brien as Steve Norris
 Jack C. Smith as General Ulysses S. Grant
Budd Buster as Jones/the Bookkeeper 
Walter Byron as Lieutenant Adams
Dorothy Fay as Julie
Jack Ingram as One-Shot Folsom
Minerva Urecal as Helen
Kenne Duncan as Crandall 
Slim Whitaker as Davis
Kit Guard as King
Carl Mathews as Elliott
Joseph W. Girard as Dr. Lawrence
 Frank LaRue as Mr. Norris 
Mantan Moreland as the Butler
Bill Nestell as a Henchman
Jim Thorpe as another Henchman

Notes

External links

1938 films
1938 Western (genre) films
1930s English-language films
American black-and-white films
Grand National Films films
American Western (genre) films
Cultural depictions of Wild Bill Hickok
American Civil War films
Films directed by Sam Newfield
1930s American films